Sierraia is a genus of freshwater snails with an operculum, aquatic prosobranch gastropod mollusks in the family Bithyniidae.

Species
Species in the genus Sierraia include:
 Sierraia expansilabrum Brown, 1988 - vulnerable, from Sierra Leone
 Sierraia leonensis Connolly, 1929 - vulnerable, from Sierra Leone
 Sierraia outambensis Brown, 1988 - critically endangered, from Sierra Leone
 Sierraia whitei Brown, 1988 - least concern, from Sierra Leone

Distribution 
This genus occurs in Sierra Leone.

References

Bithyniidae